Malhan is a village in Matli Taluka, Badin District, Sindh, Pakistan with a population of about 4000 in 300 houses from the Nizamani, Khaskheli, Shedi, Memon, Mallah, Talpur, Meghwar, Kolhi and Bhel tribes. The Sindhi Awami Tehrik, Pakistan Peoples Party and Pakistan Muslim League (F) political parties are active in the village.

References

Populated places in Badin District